Richard Combe (?1728-80), of Earnshill House, near Langport, Somerset, was a British politician.

Biography
Combe was a Member (MP) of the Parliament of England for Milborne Port 7 April - 22 May 1772 (replaced on petition 1772 by George Prescott and for Aldeburgh 1774 - 1780.

Notes

References

1728 births
1780 deaths
18th-century English people
People from Langport
Members of the Parliament of Great Britain for English constituencies
British MPs 1768–1774
British MPs 1774–1780